Highway 752 is a highway in the Canadian province of Saskatchewan. It runs from Highway 30 to Highway 44 near Greenan.

Highway 752 also passes near the community of Bickley.

See also 
Roads in Saskatchewan
Transportation in Saskatchewan

References 

752